The Eisenmann Synagogue is an historic synagogue in Antwerp, Belgium. It was built by Jacob Eisenmann in 1907 and is the only synagogue in Antwerp to have survived the Holocaust and the Nazi occupation of Belgium.

Jacob Eisenmann
Jacob (Jacques) Samuel Eisenmann was born in Frankfurt am Main. In 1884 he moved to Antwerp, where he established a company in the import of dried fruits and industrial fibers from the Belgian Congo. He was a very successful businessman and reputed to have been close with King Leopold II. His wife was the daughter of Eliezer Liepman Philip Prins and his brother-in-law was the noted painter Benjamin Prins. Eisenmann was extremely well versed in both Jewish and general topics. He was a student of Rabbi Samson Raphael Hirsh, under whom Eisenmann had studied in Frankfurt.

Founding of the Minyan
The tradition of the Jewish community in his native Frankfurt was close to his heart, and he was annoyed at the way of life of Eastern European immigrants brought to Antwerp. Specifically the lack of decorum during the tefillot and conversation during prayers that perturbed him. As a result, he decided to start his own minyan, one which the traditions of the Jewish community in Frankfurt, would be kept. In 1905 he rented three rooms in the Breughelstraat. In the beginning there were only 20-odd members of his minyan, but soon, the number of worshipers burgeoned and it became quite clear that a new space was necessary. As a result, Eisenmann decided to purchase a piece of land on Oostenstraat across the street from the railroad embankment.

The design
In 1908 Eisenmann bought two adjoining buildings, and built the synagogue to stretch through the interior of both. The facades of the buildings were not to be recognizable as a Jewish place of worship or Shul. This stealth was a crucial factor in the survival of the synagogue during the Second World War. As an architect Eisenmann chose a Mr De Lange, who had just graduated from the Royal Academy of Fine Arts. The synagogue was completed in 1909.

Book and Centennial
In 2004 a niece of Jacob Eisenmann, Els Bendheim wrote a book about the history and significance of this unique synagogue. The book was the result of much effort and research and was published by KTAV Publishing House in 2004.

In 2009 a group of descendants of Jacob Eisenmann gathered in Antwerp to celebrate and commemorate the 100th anniversary of the synagogue's founding in 1909. Over 200 people gathered at a festive ceremony among them the synagogue's primary benefactor Mr. Jack Lunzer.

References

Further reading
The Synagogue Within, Antwerpen's Eisenmann Schul, Els Bendheim, 2004

German diaspora in Europe
German-Jewish diaspora
Judaism in Antwerp
Orthodox synagogues
Religious buildings and structures in Antwerp
Synagogues in Belgium